Shahrak-e Zanjiran (also Romanized as Shahrak-e Zanjīrān; also known as Qal‘eh Zanjiran and Zanjīrān) is a village in Khvajehei Rural District, Meymand District, Firuzabad County, Fars Province, Iran. At the 2006 census, its population was 747, in 175 families.

References 

Populated places in Firuzabad County